Tàijíquán or T'ai chi ch'uan, or more commonly Tai chi or Taiji, is an internal Chinese martial art practiced for both its defense training and its health benefits.

Taiji or Tai chi may also refer to:

 Taiji (philosophy), the concept in Daoism of "the ultimate supreme" or yin and yang, on which the martial art is based, also spelled "t'ai chi"
 Taijitu, the universal symbol of Taiji, "the ultimate supreme" or yin and yang

Entertainment
 Tai Chi (band), a Hong Kong rock band
 Tai Chi (TVB), the television series broadcast by TVB

History
 Taiji (Mongol title), a 16th-century title of nobility
 Tàijí, the era of the rule of Emperor Ruizong of Tang

People
 Hong Taiji (1592–1643) or Hung T'ai chi, an early Qing dynasty Manchu emperor
 Taiji Sawada, Japanese musician
 Seo Taiji (born 1972), South Korean musician
 Taiji Tonoyama (1915–1989), Japanese actor
 Taichi "Tai" Kamiya, a character in Digimon Adventure and Digimon Adventure 02
 Taichi Ishikari or Taichi (born 1980), Japanese professional wrestler

Places
 Taiji Cave, religious site in China
 Taiji, Wakayama, a town in Japan

Other
 Taiji Program in Space, is a proposed Chinese satellite-based gravitational-wave observatory
 Taiji dolphin drive hunt, an annual dolphin hunt in Taiji, Wakayama

Similar and related words
 Taegeuk, Sino-Korean pronunciation for Taiji
 Taijitu, the symbol for the taiji concept, sometimes called the yin yang symbol
 Tai chi chih, a westernized, standardized version of t'ai chi ch'uan
 Taichi (name)
 Tao Chi (painter) (1641–1720), Ming Dynasty artist

Japanese masculine given names